Sorochinsk is a town in Orenburg Oblast, Russia, located on the Samara River (Volga's tributary),  northwest of Orenburg, the administrative center of the oblast. As of the 2010 Census, its population was 29,249.

History
It was founded in 1737 as the fortress of Sorochinskaya. It had been known as the village of Sorochinskoye since the 19th century. It was granted town status and renamed Sorochinsk in 1945.

Administrative and municipal status
Within the framework of administrative divisions, Sorochinsk serves as the administrative center of Sorochinsky District, even though it is not a part of it. As an administrative division, it is incorporated separately as the Town of Sorochinsk—an administrative unit with the status equal to that of the districts. As a municipal division, the territories of the Town of Sorochinsk and of Sorochinsky District are incorporated as Sorochinsky Urban Okrug. Prior to June 1, 2015, the Town of Sorochinsk was incorporated as Sorochinsk Urban Okrug, separately from Sorochinsky Municipal District.

Climate

References

Notes

Sources

Cities and towns in Orenburg Oblast
Buzuluksky Uyezd